Wenzhou Medical University (WMU）), designated as a key university in Wenzhou, Zhejiang, is an institution of higher learning under the leadership of Zhejiang Provincial Government.

History 
Wenzhou Medical University (WMU) is a higher institution under the administration of Zhejiang Provincial Government. It can trace its origin back to the former Zhejiang Specialized Medical School established in 1912. In August 1958, a group of faculty was sent from Zhejiang Medical College in Hangzhou to help establish the Second Zhejiang Medical College in Wenzhou, whose name was changed to Wenzhou Medical College in accordance with its location. In 2013 Wenzhou Medical College was officially renamed Wenzhou Medical University. In 2015, it was shortlisted as one of the co-development universities by the Ministry of Education, National Health Commission and Zhejiang Provincial Government. In 2017, it became a Priority Development University in Zhejiang Province.

Campuses 
WMU is composed of three campuses, located respectively at 
Chashan (Main campus)
Xueyuan Road 
Dongtou District (Binhai Campus)

These cover a combined area of about 73 ha. (=1,100 mu) with a floor space of 460,000 m2.

Organization

Schools and departments
15 Schools
School of Stomatology 
School of Basic Medical Sciences 
School of the 1st Clinical Medical Sciences, School of Information and Engineering  
School of the 2nd Clinical Medical Sciences 
School of Ophthalmology and Optometry, School of Biomedical Engineering 
School of Laboratory Science and Life Science  
School of Pharmaceutical Sciences 
School of Nursing  
School of Public Health and Management 
School of Marxism
School of Sports Science 
School of Foreign Language Studies 
School of International Studies 
School of Mental Health 
School of innovation and Entrepreneurship Education

Affiliated hospitals 

The 1st Affiliated Hospital
The 2nd Affiliated Hospital & Yuying Children's Hospital
The Affiliated Eye Hospital
The Affiliated Dental Hospital
19 non-directly-governed affiliated hospitals 
Wenzhou, Taizhou, Lishui, Wenling, Cixi, Dongyang, Yiwu, Zhuji, Zhoushan, Yueqing, Ruian, Cangnan, Xiangshan, Xinchang, Hangzhou

International cooperation 

Australia
 Queensland University of Technology

North America
New England College of Optometry, USA
Pacific University, USA
State University of New York College of Optometry, USA
University of Texas Health Science Center at Houston, USA
 University of Saskatchewan, Canada
 ...

Europe
:fr:Institut supérieur d'optique, Paris, France
 Medical University of Graz, Austria 
 Université de Bourgogne, France
 University of Central Lancashire, England
 University of Pécs, Hungary
 ...

Austria
Medical University of Graz, Austria

Asia
 Universiti Tunku Abdul Rahman, Malaysia
 University of Miyazaki, Japan
 Confucius Center, Burapha University, Thailand
 Burapha University, Thailand
 Fuji Tokoha University, Japan
 Hokuriku University, Japan
 Gachon University, Korea
 ...

Taiwan, Hong Kong and Macao
 Chung Shan Medical University, Taiwan
 I-Shou University, Taiwan 
 Macau university of science and technology, Macau
 ...

Events
Special Olympics Sports Health Center
Brightness Project
Alliance for Smile
Marrow for Life
People Inspired by Norman Bethune

Rankings 
In 2021, Academic Ranking of World Universities ranked Wenzhou Medical University within the 501-600 band globally.

People

Noteworthy alumni 

Prof. Shen Xiaoming
Vice President, Shanghai Jiaotong University
Former President, Shanghai Second Medical University
Winner, National Award of Science and Technology (twice)
(The late) Dr. Zhou Jian – Senior researcher
Began research on human papilloma virus (HPV) from 1984.
Co-invented the HPV vaccine
Successful research and development on Gardasil, bacterin for preventing cervical cancer with Prof. Ian Frazer from University of Queensland, Australia in 2005
Prof. Wang Guangjie
Tenure professor of New England College, USA
1st place in USA OD license Examination in 1991 
Prof. Miao Tianrong – Winner, Award of National Science Conference, for his creative logarithmic visual chart
Prof. Qian Li – His Abdominal Surgery greatly influenced domestic surgeons, and was later renamed in his honour.

Anniversaries
Wenzhou Medical University celebrated its 60th anniversary on 28 October 2018.

See also 
List of universities in China
Special Olympics
Avicenna Directories

References

External links 

Official Wenzhou Medical College Website  
 Official Wenzhou Medical University Website  

 
Universities and colleges in Zhejiang
Medical schools in China
Universities in China with English-medium medical schools
Educational institutions established in 1958
1958 establishments in China